{{DISPLAYTITLE:C5H8O4}}
The molecular formula C5H8O4 may refer to:

 Acetolactic acid
 4,5-Dihydroxy-2,3-pentanedione
 Dimethyl malonate
 Glutaric acid
 4-Hydroxy-2-oxopentanoic acid
 2-Methylsuccinic acid
 Xylosan